Frederick Oakes (1880 – after 1905) was an English professional footballer who played as a winger.

References

1880 births
People from West Hartlepool
Footballers from Hartlepool
English footballers
Association football wingers
New Clee Alexandra F.C. players
Grimsby St John's F.C. players
Grimsby Town F.C. players
Grimsby Rovers F.C. players
English Football League players
Year of death missing